Domel also spelled as Domail is a main town in Domel tehsil of Bannu District in Khyber Pakhtunkhwa province of Pakistan. It is also union council of Bannu District in Khyber-Pakhtunkhwa. Domel is inhabited mostly by Ahmadzai Wazir tribe of Pashtuns.

See also 
 Domel Tehsil
 Bannu District

References

Union councils of Bannu District
Populated places in Bannu District